A tragus piercing is the perforation of the tragus, which projects immediately in front of the ear canal, for the purpose of inserting and wearing a piece of jewelry. The piercing itself is usually made with a small gauge hollow piercing needle, and typical jewelry would be a small diameter captive bead ring or small gauge post style piercing jewelry. A related piercing is known as the antitragus piercing.

History
The popularity of tragus piercings began to increase around 2005, according to a BBC report.

Jewelry
Barbells, captive bead rings and flat-backed earring studs are the most common types of jewelry worn in tragus piercings.

Process
The hollow, low-gauge needle used for the piercing can be either straight or curved, depending on the piercer's preference.  Tragus piercings are generally not very painful, due to the small number of nerve endings in the tragus, but the sound made may be uncomfortable due to its proximity to the eardrum. Most tragus piercings will take between 3 and 6 months to heal, however some might take up to 12 months to be fully healed.

References

Ear piercing

ru:Пирсинг ушей#Пирсинг козелка